Aeronor-Chile was a Chilean airline company. The airline was owned by another enterprise, named Copesa, which also owns the Chilean newspaper, La Tercera.

Fleet
Fairchild F-27A

Accidents and incidents
An Aeronor Fairchild F-27A on a domestic cargo flight attempted to take off from Iquique Cavancha airport in Iquique, Chile on April 20, 1979, but had to return for an emergency landing. The plane landed on its belly. None of its four occupants were reported injured.
Aeronor Flight 304 was flying from Santiago to Antofagasta with an intermediate stop at La Serena's airport on December 9, 1982, but instead of landing at La Serena, the Fairchild F-27A crashed nearby after an engine fire, killing all 46 occupants on board, including well known reporter Silvia Pinto.

External links

Defunct airlines of Chile
Companies of Chile
Chilean brands
Society of Chile